Sir George Archdall O'Brien Reid KBE FRSE (1860–1929) was a Scottish physician, and a writer on public health and on the subject of evolution. He was interested in the effects of alcohol on society, and in the evolution of races. He was one of the first to identify alcoholism as a disease.

Life
George Archdall Reid was born in Roorkee in India, on 7 April 1860, the only son of Captain Charles Auguste Reid of the 20th Bengal Native Infantry attached to the Honourable East India Company of Scotland (HEICS).

He was educated privately then studied medicine at the University of Edinburgh graduating with an MB ChB in 1887. He then worked variously as a schoolmaster, Kauri gumdigger, stockman and hunter. In 1900 he was elected a Fellow of the Royal Society of Edinburgh. His proposers were Sir William Turner, Andrew Wilson, James Cossar Ewart and Alexander Crum Brown.

In 1919 he was created a Knight of the British Empire (KBE) by King George V.

He died of angina pectoris at 20 Lennox Road South in Southsea on 19 November 1929.

Family
In 1891 he married Florence Mahony (d.1926). Following her death he married the widow of Dr R.E. Wilmot.

Writings on evolution and heredity 
His writings on evolution and heredity are of interest as examples of thinking in this field at a time when the new science of genetics was in turmoil, following the rediscovery of the work of Gregor Mendel which appeared to conflict with Darwin's theory of evolution by natural selection. This was the start of a period in which the Modern evolutionary synthesis came into being.

Reception 
Alfred Russel Wallace, co-founder of the theory of evolution by natural selection, with Darwin, wrote of Reid:

and:

Works 
  
  (also New York : William Wood, 1902)
 The Principles of Heredity (1905)
 The Laws of Heredity (1910), Methuen and Co. Ltd London
 The Mnemic Theory of Heredity (1912)
 The Prevention of Venereal Disease (1920)

References

External links
 

1860 births
1929 deaths
19th-century Scottish medical doctors
20th-century Scottish medical doctors
British evolutionary biologists
Fellows of the Royal Society of Edinburgh
People from Haridwar
British public health doctors
Scottish biologists
Knights Commander of the Order of the British Empire